In finance, a letter of transmittal is a type of cover letter that accompanies a document, such as a financial report or security certificate.

Within financial markets it is used by a security holder to accompany certificates surrendered in an exchange or  corporate action.

A Transmittal Letter is a business letter and is formatted accordingly, it should include the recipient's address,  sender's address, distribution list, a salutation and closing. It typically includes why it should receive the reader's consideration, and what the reader should do with it.  The transmittal letter provides the recipient with a specific context in which to place the larger document or certificate and simultaneously gives the sender a permanent record of having sent the material.

References

Securities (finance)
Letters (message)